Cameron McVicar Batjer (August 24, 1919June 1, 2011) was an American lawyer and Justice on the Supreme Court of Nevada from 1967 to 1981.

Early life and education
Batjer was born on his maternal grandparents' ranch in Smith Valley, Nevada to Robert Wilhelm Batjer and Mary Belle McVicar. His father, a native of Oldenburg, Germany, was a cattle rancher and teamster, and his mother was a schoolteacher. He attended Fernley School and graduated from the University of Nevada in 1941, majoring in economics and history and was a member of Lambda Chi Alpha fraternity. He taught school in Dayton where he met and married fellow teacher Lura Gamble, a native of Hazen.

After the attack on Pearl Harbor, Batjer enlisted in the United States Navy, serving in the Seabees with the 3rd Marine Division in the Pacific Theater. While at Guadalcanal, he received a commission and was assigned to General Douglas MacArthur's staff in Brisbane, Australia. Upon returning home, he resumed his teaching career, first in McGill, and then as football and basketball coach at Fernley High School.

Career
Batjer graduated from University of Utah College of Law in 1950 and was admitted to the Utah bar. He was chief counsel of the Utah State Senate and, in 1951, was hired as chief counsel to the staff of U.S. Senator George W. Malone in Washington D.C. Returning to Nevada, he taught school and practiced law in Carson City before becoming District Attorney of Ormsby County, succeeding Paul Laxalt, in 1954. He served as chairman of the Ormsby County Republican Party and twice ran for Nevada Attorney General, albeit unsuccessfully.

When the Supreme Court of Nevada was expanded from three to five members in 1967, Governor Paul Laxalt appointed Batjer to fill one of the two new seats and was subsequently elected three times in statewide elections. He resigned from the court in 1981 to accept an appointment as chairman of the United States Parole Commission from President Ronald Reagan, a position he would serve in until his retirement in 1990. During his life, he received numerous awards including the University of Nevada Alumni Association Alumnus of the Year Award, United States Parole Commission Ben Baer Award for Outstanding Leadership, University of Utah Law School Order of the Coif, Phil Harris Award for Outstanding Service, Rotary International, and Washoe County Bar Association Lifetime Achievement Award. He died on June 1, 2011, in Carson City.

References

External links

Online Nevada Encyclopedia

1919 births
2011 deaths
United States Navy personnel of World War II
American people of German descent
District attorneys in Nevada
Military personnel from Nevada
Nevada Republicans
Justices of the Nevada Supreme Court
People from Carson City, Nevada
People from Lyon County, Nevada
S.J. Quinney College of Law alumni
Seabees
United States Navy officers
University of Nevada, Reno alumni
20th-century American judges